Our Lady of Mercy Chapel is a historic chapel at 100 Whippany Road in the Whippany section of Hanover Township in Morris County, New Jersey, United States.

It was built in 1853 and added to the National Register in 1978.

References

Roman Catholic churches in New Jersey
Roman Catholic chapels in the United States
Churches on the National Register of Historic Places in New Jersey
Carpenter Gothic church buildings in New Jersey
Roman Catholic churches completed in 1853
19th-century Roman Catholic church buildings in the United States
Churches in Morris County, New Jersey
Hanover Township, New Jersey
National Register of Historic Places in Morris County, New Jersey
New Jersey Register of Historic Places